Shibani Bathija is an Indian screenwriter known for her works in Bollywood films such as Kabhi Alvida Naa Kehna, Kidnap, My Name Is Khan and Fanaa. Bathija studied English at DePauw University and Communications at San Francisco State. After a period in advertising with SONY, Bathija showed a script to Karan Johar which was then accepted by Yash Raj Films. She served as screenwriter for two 2006 releases,  Fanaa and Kabhi Alvida Naa Kehna. Her films also include Sanjay Gadhvi's Kidnap (2008) and Karan Johar's My Name Is Khan (2010).

References

External links

"Meet the Fanaa scriptwriter - Rediff.com

DePauw University alumni
San Francisco State University alumni
Indian women screenwriters
Living people
Year of birth missing (living people)